Louisiana Highway 23 (LA 23) is a north–south state highway in Louisiana that serves Plaquemines and Jefferson Parishes. It spans  in roughly a southeast to northwest direction.  It is known locally as Belle Chasse Highway, Lafayette Street, the West Bank Expressway, and Franklin Avenue.

Route description
LA 23 connects Gretna and Venice. Between Belle Chasse and Venice, the highway serves as the main road along the west bank of the Mississippi River. In Belle Chasse, the highway crosses the Gulf Intracoastal Waterway via two antiquated crossings: southbound traffic uses the 1955-vintage Belle Chasse Tunnel, a narrow crossing that does not allow passing; northbound traffic uses the 1967-vintage Judge Perez Bridge, a vertical-lift bridge.  LA 23 runs through the small rural towns of Jesuit Bend, Naomi, Myrtle Grove, West Pointe à la Hache, Port Sulphur, Nairn, Empire, Buras, Triumph, and Boothville.  With the exception of the portion running through Port Sulphur, the entire highway is four lanes (although it is not controlled-access).

The highway is a critical hurricane evacuation route for thousands of inhabitants along the west bank of the Mississippi River.

History
At one time, LA 23 ran straight across the Westbank Expressway (U.S. Highway 90 Business), using Lafayette Street, 5th Street and Huey P. Long Avenue through downtown Gretna and crossing the Jackson Avenue-Gretna Ferry onto Jackson Avenue in New Orleans. By 1986, it had been rerouted, running along the Westbank Expressway frontage roads to Stumpf Boulevard and turning north on Stumpf and Franklin Avenue to end at Burmaster Street (LA 428). The former LA 23 to 4th Street in downtown Gretna became an extension of LA 18, while the three blocks beyond to the ferry (and Jackson Avenue in New Orleans) are now unnumbered.  Before the 1950s, LA 23 went through Terrytown via present-day Behrman Highway (LA 428).

Twinning of the highway in Plaquemines Parish was begun by Judge Perez in the 1960s.  The vertical lift bridge in Belle Chasse was added in 1968, and the Empire Jetty Bridge over Dollut Canal, a high-rise bridge, opened in 1976, replacing a 26-year-old lift bridge.

In Plaquemines Parish, sections of the original LA 23, since bypassed, are signed as Parish Road 11 (although some maps erroneously list these routes as LA-11), such as in Jesuit Bend and the area south of Port Sulphur through Empire, Buras, and Fort Jackson.  Prior to Louisiana's 1955 highway renumbering, LA 23 through Plaquemines Parish was LA 31, and there are some bridges, such as the Bayou Barriere crossings in northern Belle Chasse, that still bear the original numbering.

As of 2019, the portion from U.S. Highway 90 Business to LA 428 is under agreement to be removed from the state highway system and transferred to local control.

Major intersections

References

External links

La DOTD State, District, and Parish Maps
District 02
Plaquemines Parish (Northeast Section)
Plaquemines Parish (Southwest Section)
Plaquemines Parish (Northwest Section)
Jefferson Parish (North Section)

0023
Transportation in Plaquemines Parish, Louisiana
Transportation in Jefferson Parish, Louisiana
023